Huapalcalco is a pre-Columbian Mesoamerican archeological site located some 5 kilometers north of Tulancingo in the state of Hidalgo, Mexico.

The site was built on the west slope of the "Tecolote" hill; the slope is separated east-west by a ravine that forms two sectors at the foot of the hill and two more on the top, all of which contain archaeological vestiges.

The site depicts Teotihuacán influence, and some believe that Topilitzin Quetzalcóatl resided here, before governing Tula. Also it is considered the oldest human occupation site in the Hidalgo State.

It is believed that it must have been a very important civil, religious and housing center. It is known that it was the second Toltec Empire, before Tula.

The city was of olmeca-xicalanca origin, or the first settler tribes of the great central plateau of the mountain range. The meaning of such wooden building is not known, it was probably built when the ancient native people settled; perhaps it was a building destined as a Telpochcalli, for military training, justice administration, or learning dances or music.

Men passed through the Bering Straits 40 thousand years, 30 thousand years ago, men reached the Mexican plains and about 13 thousand years ago, men reached Huapalcalco in the Hidalgo, State, where vestiges have been located that date back to that period.

Huapalcalco is a mesoamerican classical period (100 to 650 CE), formed part of the State Teotihuacan, however, both its architecture and pottery is not equal to Teotihuacan, i.e. there is Teotihuacan influence, but are not Teotihuacan. It is not known what culture built these monuments; it can only be said that it is closely related to the Teotihuacan culture and had influence of the cultures of the Gulf Coast.

Background 

During the Lithic period (10,000 - 3500 BCE) the first signs of human hunter-gatherers are noted in the valley. It's not until the gradual transition into the archaic period (8000 – 2000 BCE) that we start to see the first human settlements developing in Mesoamerica along with the development of agriculture. The Pre-classical, or Formative Stage, sees the emergence of the first civilization, the Olmecs lasting between (2000 BCE - 250 CE). During the Classical period (250-900 CE) Tulancingo becomes an important trade center, with roads and residential areas. It is during this period that Huapalcalco was built, of which today remain only a three-sided pyramid and stairway, built in the Toltec style.

Cave Paintings 
The earliest cave paintings in the area are located at the Huiztle hill and Huapalcalco plateau; these cave paintings transmit testimony of primitive groups’ life experiences in representations of men, schematic outlines, and astronomical figures dating back to 9,000 BCE.

A lizard and men are portrayed. A man is depicted in the act of throwing a prehistoric version of the atlátl spear, a javelin-like weapon used with an arm extension, with a type of large spoon dart in the end, it was used mainly to hunt ducks that must have existed by the thousands in the lagoon located west of the site.

These were hunter-gatherer men that did not have animals in captivity but knew how to hunt and use fire to cook.

Huapalcalco Legend 
The Huapalcalco (or Coapalcallico) City was punished by the Gods, the punishment was imposed because their people were not able to defend it against invaders and were conquered by other civilizations, they constructed buildings over their structures.

The Gods were angry by such a situation, hence they completely buried the city, a city that was very expansive, covering an area about 10 km2, which would include the area of what today is from Huapalcalco up to Abra, Santiago and Acatlán.

There was only one solution to remove the curse, the Gods said to the Shamans, the curse could only be removed on June 24 at midnight, at such exact time a bridge would appear between both Coapalcallico hills, over the Main Pyramid.

And only at that instant, a man, woman, boy or girl with the purest and bravest soul could cross it and pull on a gold chain that would appear in the other side of the bridge and after pulling on the chain, the city, buried by the curse of the Gods would reappear.

Tulancingo City-State 

 
Tulancingo, was a forerunner of the Teotihuacan civilization. The name derives from the Nahuatl words "tule" and "tzintle" which mean "in or behind the reeds." This is confirmed by its Aztec glyph.

The area is home to some of the oldest settlements in Mesoamerica, such as Huapalcalco and El Pedregal. These first settlements have been attributed to the Olmecs, Xicalancas and other tribes. The city was founded in 645 BCE by the Toltecs with the name Tolancingo as part of the empire centered in Tula. During this period, the city was home to schools and temples. A calendar stone was sculpted here and a temple called Mitlancalco was built to receive the bodies of priests and princes. After 1116 CE, the Toltec empire declined and the city was abandoned.

According to the Tribute Codex (Códice de los Tributos), the Tulancingo area was a commercial center for the Otomi-Tepehua and Totonac people since about 1000 CE bringing traders from lands now in the states of Hidalgo, Puebla and Veracruz. Traditional trading still exists in the form of the Thursday "Tianguis" or market.

The Chichimecas came to rule here under King Xolotl (Chichimec ruler) starting around 1120. The city was refounded by these people and the remaining Toltecs.  The population increased with the arrival of the Tlaxcaltecas. In 1324, a king named Quinantzin, reorganized the area politically, making Tulancingo the head of a province. Tulancingo marched against Texcoco, but was defeated. In the early 15th century, this same Texcoco, under Huitzilihuit, conquered Tulancingo, putting it within the Aztec Empire. In 1431, the Tulancingo area was again reorganized politically under Itzcoatl and Nezahualcoyotl.

Eventually, Tulancingo became part of the Texcoco empire and in 1416, was taken by the Aztec might empire. Since then, Tulancingo was divided into two sectors: Tlaixpa, located to the east, inhabited mostly by native Otomi; and Tlatoca in the west, inhabited by Nahua. The inhabitants of both sides paid tribute to the Aztec kingdom; tributes consisted of cotton blankets and seeds, such as corn and amaranth.

Although Tulancingo was a tributary of the Mexicas, they maintained certain administrative independence, they choose their own authorities. This city was an important food stocking place for the Aztecs.

Olmec-Xicalanca
The mid-classical period ended in Northern Mesoamerica with the decline of Teotihuacan ca 700 CE. This allowed regional centers of power to flourish and compete for control of trade routes and the exploitation of natural resources. In this way the late Classic era commenced. As stated above, this was a time of political fragmentation during which no city had complete hegemony. Various population movements occurred during this period, caused by the incursion of groups from Aridoamerica and other northern regions, who pushed the older populations of Mesoamerica toward the south. Among these new groups were the Nahua, who would found the cities of Tula and Tenochtitlan, the two most important capitals of the Postclassical era. In addition to the migrations from the north, southern peoples finally established themselves in the center of Mexico. Among these were the Olmec-Xicalanca, who came from the Yucatán Peninsula and founded Cacaxtla and Xochicalco.

The term Olmec-Xicalancas refers to a particular culture (not to be confused with the pre-classical Olmec civilization), whom occupied and influenced the nearby areas. A unique difference between the Olmec-Xicalancas groups [and other Mesoamerican cities] were that each group (city-state) would have been governed by a tahualz, a King or ruler, independent of each other. In reality, they had two tahualz for each city-state.

They had a writing system that at least included 10 signs, pictograms of the Sun, the Moon, a tree, a field harvest, a person, etc. Religion would have been polytheistic. The most important was the Sun God called different in both villages.

Other Olmec-Xicalanca Sites:

 Cantona (Mesoamerican site)
 Cacaxtla
 Cholula (Mesoamerican site)
 Xochicalco

The Site 

Huapalcalco corresponds to the Mesoamerican Classical period (100 to 650 CE) and was part of the state of Teotihuacán, nevertheless, both their architecture and ceramics are not the same as to those used in Teotihuacán culture, that is to say, they have Teotihuacán influence but are not of Teotihuacan origin. It is not known who constructed these monuments, it can only be said that it has a large Teotihuacan cultural influence and it had influence on other Gulf Coast cultures.

Investigations 
The northwestern sector, perhaps the most important, was explored in 1954 by archaeologist Florencia Jacobs Müller and Cesar Lizardi Ramos. After nine expeditions, concluding in 1959, they discovered a pyramidal monument complex with evident Teotihuacán influence and a plaza with a Stele (Mayan influence), Totonac yokes and a round altar.

The remarkable finding of Totonac yokes shows the influence of the Gulf of Mexico coastal cultures, as well as the discovery of a sculpture of the Teotihuacan God of fire.

An important finding was achieved when excavating the deepest part of one of the buildings, it consisted of arrowheads meserve type, that correspond to a pre-ceramic culture 7,000 BCE., and whose chronology matches a hand axe found of prehistoric type in the remains of a burnt cave in cliffs of "el Tecolote" hill, where also were found cave paintings of geometric human character predominating the red color, demonstrating the presence of Paleolithic man (approximately 10,000 BCE) in Huapalcalco.

A recent finding on the highest part of "El Tecolote" hill, located at the south-eastern corner, consisting of a pyramid foundation built with stone slabs and stucco finishing. A symmetrical monument, not yet explored, is located at the north-east corner, at the other side of the ravine, natives know the place as "iglesias viejas".

Huapalcalco has a 39 hectares extension, where more than 55 families currently live; within this area is the Archaeological Site in an enclosed 4 hectares perimeter.

Toponymy 
Huapalcalco is a Nahuatl word, huapalli, "board or small beam "; calli, "house", y co, location proposition. Means "place of the wooden house ".

The Huapalcalco Glyph represents a battlement building, with three doors, apparently made from wood, different from the common calli glyph, is the graphical idea of huapalcalli [vapalcalli], which means "tent or house of tables."   Huapal calli, is composed of calli, house, and huapalli or huapalitl, board or small beam: Huapal cal co, "in the house of boards, "or the wooden building".

Structures 
The site features a Teotihuacan influenced three-sided pyramid, 12 meters base by 8 meters high, with an altar that possibly was used for sacrificial offerings.

There are approximately 28 knolls: small pyramids buried, in which no archaeological work has been made.

The hill slope is divided by a ravine that divides the two sectors, this place is where Friar Bernardino de Sahagún passed and described it saying that it "has crystalline water cascades, at the foot stones, women were washing clothes while children swam and plunged into water".

Over the ravine stones are the cave paintings, which are difficult to see, these are dispersed over the "Cerro La Mesa" behind the pyramid. It is sad that graffiti has reached them, making them in some points confusing.  Also white crosses are painted in the stone by current inhabitants of the place, namely to scare away witches and nahuales.

On the slope, between rocky crags, the walls sink shaping the well-known caves of the place; villagers usually place altars to honor their dead.  In front of the "Tecolote" Cave, the remains of a prehistoric man was found, according to carbon 14 tests made, this man lived here 10 thousand years ago. The remains are kept in the National Museum of Anthropology and History of Mexico City, in the Prehistoric Room.

Vandalism 
Vandals destroyed the Huapalcalco archaeological zone, considered one of Tulancingo cultural patrimonies.

Source of construction materials
Stones originating from the pre-Hispanic ruins of the Huapalcalco archaeological zone, in the municipality of Tulancingo, have been used for the construction of houses by people living around the site. This happened due to the evident negligence on the part of the National Institute of Anthropology and History (INAH) state delegation.

Claims of neglect
The archaeological site appeared to be forgotten and neglected without regular maintenance. This contributed to signs of vandalism in the area, putting the Huapalcalco cave paintings (more than 10 thousand years old) in danger from graffiti, bonfire soot, acts of vandalism and employee neglect.

Arriving to the site was difficult. On a side of the federal highway to Tuxpan, that crosses the city of Tulancingo, there is a deviation to Huapalcalco, where a rusty signboard welcomes people to the archaeological zone and cave paintings. The National Institute of Anthropology and History (INAH) logo was barely visible.

As of a visit in January, 2014, the road to the site is marked visibly with blue INAH signs and there are staff onsite to assist visitors.

References

External links 
 Municipio Tulancingo Official website 
 State of Hidalgo Official website

Bibliography 
 Menes Llaguno, Juan Manuel. Historia mínima del Estado de Hidalgo, 2006. M.A. Porrúa 9707016949 
 Ballesteros, Víctor M. & Cuatepotzo Costeira, Miguel Ángel. Canto de Sol, Hidalgo; Tierra, historia y gente (2003) Sistema de Educación Pública del Estado de Hidalgo, Pachuca, Hidalgo. 9687517212

Further reading 
 Mesoamerican chronology
 Tulancingo de Bravo
 Tulancingo’s History  
 Pachuca’s History 

Mesoamerican sites
Archaeological sites in Hidalgo (state)